The Asia Pacific Lacrosse Union (APLU) is the governing body for the sport of lacrosse in Asia and Oceania.

It was founded in 2004, with four national lacrosse associations of Australia, Hong Kong , South Korea, and Japan as its founding members. Within the same year the first edition of the Asia Pacific Lacrosse Championship was held in Australia. It currently has 12 member national associations (8 full members, 4 associate members) with World Lacrosse as an affiliate member of the APLU.

Membership
Full
 China
 Australia
 Hong Kong
 Japan
 South Korea
 New Zealand
 Taiwan (Chinese Taipei)
 Thailand

Associate
 India
 Malaysia
 Mongolia
 Singapore

Affiliate
World Lacrosse

References

 
International lacrosse